is a Japanese castle located in Matsue, Shimane Prefecture.

Matsue Castle was constructed from 1607 to 1611 by Horio Yoshiharu, the first daimyō of the Matsue Domain, during the early Edo period. Ownership was passed to the Izumo branch of the Kyōgoku in 1633 and then the Matsudaira, a junior branch of the ruling Tokugawa clan, in 1637. The Matsudaira donated Matsue Castle to the city of Matsue in 1927.

Matsue Castle is one of few remaining feudal Japanese castles in their original wooden form and not a modern concrete reconstruction. Built after the last great war of feudal Japan, the castle has survived earthquakes, fires, wars and other causes that destroyed or damaged other Japanese castles. Several castle buildings were demolished during the early Meiji period with only some of the original keep and stone walls existing today. Matsue Castle, standing on the shores of Lake Shinji, is one of Japan's Three Great Lake Castles and the heart of Matsue's central riverside district.

History
Of the 100+ castles remaining in Japan, Matsue Castle is the only one remaining in the San'in region. This castle is the second largest, the third tallest (30m) and the sixth oldest amongst castles. It was built over a period of 5 years by the daimyō of the Izumo region, Horio Yoshiharu, and was completed in 1611.

After the reigns of Horio Tadaharu and Kyōgoku Tadataka, Matsudaira Naomasa, a grandson of Tokugawa Ieyasu, became Lord of the castle, after being transferred from Matsumoto in Shinano Province, and thus began a reign that lasted 10 generations of the Matsudaira clan over a period of 234 years.

In 1875, all of the buildings within the castle were dismantled, with the exception of the castle tower itself, which was allowed to remain due to pressure from interest groups. The castle underwent a complete reconstruction between 1950 and 1955.

The castle is a complex structure, built in a watchtower-style, that appears to be five stories from the outside, but has, in fact, six levels inside. Most of the walls of the castle are painted black. It is a strong structure, built to withstand warfare, yet at the same time, it is majestic and solemn, reminiscent of the Momoyama style.

Matsue Castle has been registered as a national treasure of Japan since July 9, 2015.

Gallery

References

Literature

External links 

 Japan Guide
 Visit Matsue
 Matsue Tourism
 Tripadvisor

Castles in Shimane Prefecture
Museums in Shimane Prefecture
History museums in Japan
Historic Sites of Japan
National Treasures of Japan
Kyōgoku clan
Matsue-Matsudaira clan